Michal Navrátil (born 20 November 1982) is a former professional tennis player from the Czech Republic.

Biography

Early life
Born in Přerov, he is the son of former player and later Davis Cup captain Jaroslav Navrátil. As a youngster the left-hander trained at the National Tennis Centre in Moravia. He and Ladislav Chramosta made the 1999 Australian Open boys' doubles final, which they lost in three sets to Kristian Pless and Jürgen Melzer.

Professional career
As a professional player he won seven Futures titles in singles but didn't have success on the Challenger circuit. In doubles however he won three Challenger events, as well as 14 Futures titles. He had one main draw entry on the ATP Tour, when he and Tomáš Berdych were given a wildcard for the doubles at the Campionati Internazionali di Sicilia in 2005, but the pair had to withdraw before the match. This handed a walkover win to third seeds Martín García and Mariano Hood, who went on to win the tournament.

Coaching
Navrátil is now based in Prostějov and like his father is involved in coaching. He was a member of Tomáš Berdych's travelling team for many years as his practise partner. Players coached include Adam Pavlásek, Jiří Veselý and Jiří Lehečka, who made it into the world's top 100 rankings under his tutelage.

Challenger titles

Doubles: (3)

References

External links
 
 

1982 births
Living people
Czech male tennis players
Czech tennis coaches
Sportspeople from Přerov